{{Infobox magazine
| title = Dave Campbell's Texas Football
| logo = 
| logo_size = 
| image_file = DCTF2008Cover.jpg
| image_size = 
| image_alt = 
| image_caption = The 2008 summer edition of Dave Campbell's Texas
| editor = Greg Tepper
| editor_title = 
| previous_editor = 
| staff_writer = 
| photographer = 
| category = Sports
| frequency = Biannual and premium online subscription content available at www.texasfootball.com
| circulation = 100,000
| publisher = 
| founder = Dave Campbell
| founded = 1960
| firstdate = 
| company = Sports In Action, LLC (formerly Highfield Marketing, LLC)
| country = United States
| based = Lewisville, Texas
| language = English
| website = 
| issn = 0147-1287
| oclc = 
| President = Adam Hochfelder
}}Dave Campbell's Texas Football is a biannual magazine previewing American football teams in the state of Texas.

It previews football teams in Texas at all levels, from the NFL's Dallas Cowboys and Houston Texans, college football, to the roughly 1,400 high schools (public and private) in the state.

The summer magazine is issued in June, about 1–2 months before the start of preseason football. It sells for $11.95 and is available in most Texas stores which sell magazines. A winter edition, which began in 2008, is published each January.  In 2015, the winter magazine became known as Texas Football Rising which focuses solely on recruiting and recruiting rankings.

History
The magazine was started in 1960 by Dave Campbell, a longtime writer and sports editor for the Waco Tribune-Herald, along with fellow Waco sportswriters Hollis Biddle, Jim Montgomery, and Al Ward, plus Campbell's wife, Reba. He published the magazine out of his kitchen. On the cover of the inaugural edition was Texas Longhorns running back Jack Collins. The cover price for the first 96-page magazine was fifty cents.

It was bought in 1985 by Host Communications, which was bought by IMG in 2007.  In 2014, Sports in Action, a company operated by the family of Texas businessman Drayton McLane and run by President Adam Hochfelder bought the rights to operate the magazine from IMG.  

It is one of the best-selling football magazines in the state and has been dubbed "The Bible of Texas Football". Each year, the identity of its cover subject(s) is a tightly-guarded secret. Campbell held the position of editor-in-chief until his death in 2021 at age 96.

Currently, Dave Campbell's Texas Football is a twice-yearly statewide magazine with more than 400,000 readers. In 2015, Sports In Action created a yearly sister magazine, Dave Campbell's Texas Basketball, with an accompanying web site.

The website, TexasFootball.com, was created in 1999. It added premium content covering recruiting and other topics, bundled with the annual subscription cost, in 2018.

In the summer of 2009, Texas Football launched a statewide weekly radio program — the Dave Campbell's Texas Football Radio Hour — which aired across Texas State Network affiliates.  The radio show ended in 2016.  In 2010, the magazine started its own television program, Texas Football Game Day, a half-hour show. Game Day was filmed weekly at the stadium of a key game and broadcast (sometimes live, sometime tape delayed) on Fox Sports Southwest.  Due to its popularity, in 2011 DCTF partnered with Fox Sports Southwest to present Fox Football Friday Powered by Dave Campbell's Texas Football, a three-hour live show on Friday nights featuring whip-around coverage of the biggest games in Texas high school football. In October 2015, DCTF launched Texas Football Today, a daily live show covering football in Texas streamed on TexasFootball.com and its social media platforms.Texas Football also ran its own high school football event, the Texas Football Classic, which was held at the beginning of each season at the Alamodome in San Antonio. The event ran from 1999-2010.

The Texas Football brand is run by President Adam Hochfelder, and editorial content — including the magazine, website, TV show and Texas Football Today — are run by managing editor Greg Tepper, assistant managing editor Ishmael Johnson, executive producer Ashley Pickle, web/social manager William Wilkerson, college insider Mike Craven and associate editor Mallory Hartley. Hochfelder has been in charge of the brand since 2005 and Tepper has been editor since 2011.

Dave Campbell died on December 10, 2021, after a short illness at the age of 96.

Summer magazine covers
1960s
1960: Jack Collins of Texas
1961: Ronnie Bull of Baylor (also pictured: Lance Alworth, Arkansas and James Saxton, Texas)
1962: Sonny Gibbs of TCU
1963: Coach Darrell Royal and Scott Appleton of Texas
1964: Lawrence Elkins and John Bridgers of Baylor
1965: Donny Anderson of Texas Tech
1966: John LaGrone of SMU (also pictured: Greg Pipes, Baylor and Diron Talbert, Texas)
1967: Maurice Moorman of Texas A&M
1968: Edd Hargett of Texas A&M
1969: James Street of Texas

1970s
1970: Steve Worster of Texas
1971: Charles Napper of Texas Tech
1972: Brad Dusek of Texas A&M
1973: Glen Gaspard of Texas
1974: Coach Darrell Royal of Texas
1975: Coach Grant Teaff of Baylor
1976: Coach Bill Yeoman of Houston
1977: Rodney Allison of Texas Tech
1978: Russell Erxleben of Texas and Tony Franklin of Texas A&M
1979: Steve McMichael of Texas

1980s
1980: Mike Singletary of Baylor and Mike Mosley of Texas A&M
1981: Craig James of SMU and Walter Abercrombie of Baylor
1982: Gary Kubiak of Texas A&M
1983: Lance McIlhenny of SMU
1984: Ray Childress of Texas A&M
1985: Coach Jim Wacker and Kenneth Davis of TCU
1986: Coach Jackie Sherrill of Texas A&M
1987: Coach David McWilliams and Bret Stafford of Texas
1988: Eric Metcalf of Texas and John Roper of Texas A&M
1989: Coach Jack Pardee of Houston and Coach Forrest Gregg of SMU

1990s
1990: Coach Spike Dykes of Texas Tech
1991: David Klingler of Houston
1992: Trevor Cobb of Rice
1993: Coach R. C. Slocum of Texas A&M (also pictured: Jerrod Douglas of Converse Judson)
1994: Shea Morenz of Texas (also pictured: Tony Brackens of Texas)
1995: An illustrated collage featuring important figures in Southwest Conference history, including Earl Campbell, Bill Yeoman, Darrell Royal, Fred Akers, Sammy Baugh, Doak Walker, Mike Singletary, and Grant Teaff
1996: Coach Chuck Reedy of Baylor, Coach John Mackovic of Texas, Coach R. C. Slocum of Texas A&M and Coach Spike Dykes of Texas Tech
1997: James Brown and Ricky Williams of Texas (also pictured: Coach Kim Helton of Houston)
1998: Two covers: one with Coach Mack Brown and Ricky Williams of Texas, the other with Dat Nguyen of Texas A&M
1999: Coach Mack Brown of Texas, Coach Dennis Franchione of TCU
1999 (alternative cover): Troy Aikman of the Dallas Cowboys, for sale outside the state of Texas

2000s
2000: Cedric Benson of Midland Lee
2001: Casey Printers of TCU, Kliff Kingsbury of Texas Tech, Chris Simms of Texas and Mark Farris of Texas A&M McKenzie Tilmon of Irving MacArthur High
2002: Kliff Kingsbury of Texas Tech, Coach G.A. Moore of Celina High School, Emmitt Smith of the Dallas Cowboys, and Drew Tate of Baytown Lee
2003: Roy Williams of Texas
2004: Adell Duckett of Texas Tech, Patrick Cobbs of North Texas, Marvin Godbolt of TCU and Kevin Kolb of Houston
2005: Vince Young of Texas and Reggie McNeal of Texas A&M
2006: Earl Campbell of Texas, John Chiles of Mansfield Summit, Ryan Mallett of Texarkana Texas, Jarrett Lee of Brenham, and G. J. Kinne of Gilmer
2007: Tommy Blake of TCU, Colt McCoy of Texas, and Stephen McGee of Texas A&M
2008: Coach Mike Leach, Michael Crabtree, and Graham Harrell of Texas Tech
2009: Colt McCoy of Texas

2010s
2010: Jerrod Johnson of Texas A&M, Case Keenum of Houston, and Andy Dalton of TCU
2011: Cyrus Gray of Texas A&M and Johnathan Gray of Aledo
2012: Coach Gary Patterson of TCU
2013: Johnny Manziel of Texas A&M
2014: Coach Art Briles, Bryce Petty, and Antwan Goodley of Baylor
2015: Illustration of the Texas vs. Texas A&M football rivalry by artist Roberto Parada
2016: Coach Kliff Kingsbury and Patrick Mahomes of Texas Tech
2017: Coach Tom Herman of Texas
2018: Coach Jimbo Fisher of Texas A&M (alternate cover: Ed Oliver of Houston)
2019: Sam Ehlinger of Texas

2020s
2020: Shane Buechele of SMU
2021: Michael Clemons, Myles Jones, DeMarvin Leal and Demani Richardson of Texas A&M
2022: Coach Jeff Traylor of UTSA and Coach Joey McGuire of Texas Tech

Winter magazine covers
When the University of Texas won the BCS national title in the 2006 Rose Bowl, Texas Football put out a special championship edition of the magazine. Two years later, the magazine brought back the winter edition as a permanent feature. Beginning in 2016, the winter edition was replaced with Dave Campbell Presents Texas Football Rising, a magazine spotlighting top recruits in Texas.

2006: Vince Young of Texas
2008: Coach Mike Sherman of Texas A&M
2009: Quan Cosby of Texas, Michael Crabtree of Texas Tech, and Chase Clement of Rice
2010: Jordan Shipley of Texas and Jerry Hughes of TCU
2011: Coach Gary Patterson of TCU
2012: Robert Griffin III of Baylor
2013: Johnny Manziel of Texas A&M
2014: Bryce Petty of Baylor
2015: Trevone Boykin of TCU, Kyler Murray of Allen, and Tony Romo of the Dallas Cowboys

Texas Football Rising
2015: Jett Duffey of Lake Ridge (Texas Tech)
2016: Baron Browning of Kennedale (Ohio State)
2017: Keaontay Ingram of Carthage (Texas)
2018: Kenyon Green of Atascosita (Texas A&M)
2019: Haynes King of Longview (Texas A&M)
2020: Ja'Tavion Sanders of Denton Ryan (Texas)
2021: Denver Harris of Galena Park North Shore
2022: David Hicks Jr. of Katy Paetow

Mr. Texas Football
When Texas Football'' revived the winter book after the 2007 season, it began giving a "Mr. Texas Football Award" honoring the top high school player in the state. It is currently sponsored by Wells Fargo
2007: Jacquizz Rodgers, Rosenberg Lamar
2008: Garrett Gilbert, Lake Travis
2009: Darian "Stump" Godfrey, Gilmer
2010: Johnny Manziel, Kerrville Tivy
2011: Johnathan Gray, Aledo
2012: Dontre Wilson, DeSoto
2013: Kyler Murray, Allen
2014: Kyler Murray, Allen
2015: Jett Duffey, Mansfield Lake Ridge
2016: Roshauud Paul, Bremond
2017: Spencer Sanders, Denton Ryan
2018: Landry Gilpin, Veterans Memorial
2019: Marvin Mims, Lone Star
2020: Jonathan Brooks, Hallettsville
2021: Major Bowden, China Spring

Dave Campbell's Texas Basketball
2015: Coach Tubby Smith of Texas Tech and Shaka Smart of Texas
2016: Coaches Kim Mulkey and Scott Drew of Baylor
2017: Brooke McCarty and Coach Karen Aston of Texas, Kalani Brown and Coach Kim Mulkey of Baylor
2018: Chris Beard of Texas Tech
2019: Lauren Cox of Baylor

References

External links
 TexasFootball.com
 TexasBasketball.com

1960 establishments in Texas
American football in Texas
Biannual magazines published in the United States
Magazines established in 1960
Magazines published in Texas
Mass media in Dallas
Sports magazines published in the United States